In machine learning, diffusion models, also known as diffusion probabilistic models, are a class of latent variable models. They are Markov chains trained using variational inference. The goal of diffusion models is to learn the latent structure of a dataset by modeling the way in which data points diffuse through the latent space. In computer vision, this means that a neural network is trained to denoise images blurred with Gaussian noise by learning to reverse the diffusion process. Three examples of generic diffusion modeling frameworks used in computer vision are denoising diffusion probabilistic models, noise conditioned score networks, and stochastic differential equations.

Diffusion models were introduced in 2015 with a motivation from non-equilibrium thermodynamics.

Diffusion models can be applied to a variety of tasks, including image denoising, inpainting, super-resolution, and image generation. For example, an image generation model would start with a random noise image and then, after having been trained reversing the diffusion process on natural images, the model would be able to generate new natural images. Announced on 13 April 2022, OpenAI's text-to-image model DALL-E 2 is a recent example. It uses diffusion models for both the model's prior (which produces an image embedding given a text caption) and the decoder that generates the final image.

Mathematical principles

Generating an image in the space of all images 
Consider the problem of image generation. Let  represent an image, and let  be the probability distribution over all possible images. If we have  itself, then we can say for certain how likely a certain image is. However, this is intractable in general.

Most often, we are uninterested in knowing the absolute probability that a certain image is -- when, if ever, are we interested in how likely an image is in the space of all possible images? Instead, we are usually only interested in knowing how likely a certain image is compared to its immediate neighbors -- how more likely is this image of cat, compared to some small variants of it? Is it more likely if the image contains two whiskers, or three, or with some gaussian noise added?

Consequently, we are actually quite uninterested in  itself, but rather, . This performs two effects
 One, we no longer need to normalize , but can use any , where  is any unknown constant that is of no concern to us.
 Two, we are comparing  neighbors , by 

As it turns out,  allows us to sample from  using stochastic gradient Langevin dynamics, which is essentially an infinitesimal version of Markov chain Monte Carlo.

Learning the score function 
The score function can be learned by noising-denoising.

Main variants

Classifier guidance 
Suppose we wish to sample not from the entire distribution of images, but conditional on the image description. We don't want to sample a generic image, but an image that fits the description "black cat with red eyes". Generally, we want to sample from the distribution , where  ranges over images, and  ranges over classes of images (a description "black cat with red eyes" is just a very detailed class, and a class "cat" is just a very vague description).

Image generation is then nothing but inferring what the  that the requester had in mind.

In other words, conditional image generation is simply "translating from a textual language into a pictorial language". Then, as in noisy-channel model, we use Bayes theorem to getin other words, if we have a good model of the space of all images, and a good image-to-class translator, we get a class-to-image translator "for free".

With temperature 
If we want to force the model to move towards the maximum likelihood estimate , we can use where  is interpretable as inverse temperature. In the context of diffusion models, it is usually called the guidance scale. This often improves quality of generated images.

This can be done simply by SGLD with

Classifier-free guidance 

This is an integral part of systems like GLIDE, DALL-E and Google Imagen.

See also
 Diffusion process
 Markov chain
 Variational inference
 Variational autoencoder

Further reading 
 Guidance: a cheat code for diffusion models. Good overview up to 2022.

References

Markov models
Machine learning algorithms